Kevin "She'kspere" Briggs is an American record producer, known for producing the TLC #1 hit "No Scrubs" and various Destiny's Child songs from the album The Writing's on the Wall. Briggs' then girlfriend, former Xscape singer Kandi Burruss, composed the lyrics of TLC's "No Scrubs", Destiny's Child hits "Bills, Bills, Bills" and "Bug a Boo", and Pink's debut single "There You Go" to accompany his productions. Briggs' post-2001 productions saw a new sound from Briggs, as can be heard on the tracks he produced for Whitney Houston and Blu Cantrell.

Briggs also received writing credit for Ed Sheeran's Shape of You following the song's copyright controversy.

Songwriting and production credits

Credits are courtesy of Discogs, Tidal, Spotify, Apple Music, and AllMusic.

Awards and nominations

References

External links

Living people
American record producers
African-American songwriters
American male songwriters
Grammy Award winners
Year of birth missing (living people)
21st-century African-American people